This is a list of the highest-grossing comedy films.

Highest-grossing comedy films

, the top nine films, and 34 of the top 50 films, are animated films, marked with "A" in the Type column. "LA" indicates live-action films. Click the column header to sort them separately. The top six films are among the highest-grossing films of all time.

When adjusted for inflation, Snow White and the Seven Dwarfs would appear at the top of the chart with an adjusted gross of $.

A: Animated film.   LA: Live action film.   H: Live-action animated film (hybrid).

Highest-grossing comedy film by year

Timeline of highest-grossing comedy film

Comedy films by box office admissions

The following is a list of comedy films by estimated tickets sold worldwide.

Highest-grossing comedy film series and franchises

Biggest worldwide openings on record for comedy films
This list charts films the biggest worldwide openings for comedy films. Since films do not open on Fridays in many markets, the 'opening' is taken to be the gross between the first day of release and the first Sunday following the movie's release. Figures prior to the year 2002 are not available. Country-by-country variations in release dates are not taken into account.

See also
 List of highest-grossing films
 Lists of highest-grossing films

Notes

References

Comedy
Film box office